The 2015 San Diego Aviators season was the 21st season of the franchise in World TeamTennis (WTT) and its second playing in San Diego County, California.

After a successful inaugural season in San Diego in which the team had the best regular-season record in WTT, the Aviators had 5 wins and 9 losses, finished third in the Western Conference and failed to qualify for the playoffs.

Season recap

New ownership
On December 18, 2014, the Aviators announced that Fred Luddy and Jack McGrory, formerly minority owners, had acquired control of the team from Russell Geyser. According to the team's website as of January 2015, Luddy became the majority owner, Geyser retained a minority stake, and team CEO Billy Berger acquired a minority interest in the team. Shelly Hall, who was the onetime general manager of the San Diego Friars and served in that position for the Aviators in 2014, was no longer listed as part of the team's staff. As of March 2015, Geyser was no longer listed on the team's website as one of the team's minority owners.

Move to Carlsbad
On December 29, 2014, the Aviators announced that the team  would move its home matches to the Omni La Costa Resort and Spa in nearby Carlsbad for the 2015 season.

New logo
On January 6, 2015, the Aviators unveiled their new logo on their Facebook page. In a significant change from the multicolored logo used in 2014, the new logo contains only thunderbird red and white.

Lloyd hired as coach
On March 3, 2015, the Aviators announced that John Lloyd had been hired as the team's new head coach to replace 2014 WTT Coach of the Year David Macpherson, who had expressed a desire to coach in the Sacramento metropolitan area with the newly-relocated California Dream. When Macpherson was later introduced as the Dream's new head coach, he said, "I’m very excited to be coaching in the city where I started my WTT career back in 1992."

Trade of Bryan brothers and draft
Since David Macpherson had long served as the coach for the Bryan brothers, it was inevitable that the twins would want to follow him just as they did when he was hired as the Aviators' head coach in 2014. Consequently, prior to the WTT draft on March 16, 2015, the Aviators traded Bob and Mike Bryan to the Dream for financial consideration. The Aviators did not protect 2014 WTT Female Most Valuable Player Daniela Hantuchová in the marquee portion of the draft. Madison Keys was assigned to the Aviators as a league-designated player, and they selected her as their only marquee draft pick. In the roster portion of the draft, the Aviators protected Raven Klaasen and Květa Peschke. They did not protect 2014 WTT Male Rookie of the Year Somdev Devvarman. The Aviators selected amateur Taylor Fritz and Chanelle Scheepers in the roster portion of the draft. Fritz was the only amateur player selected in the 2015 WTT draft.

Other player transactions
On June 26, 2015, the Aviators began listing Darija Jurak as a member of the team, and Květa Peschke was removed from the active roster. In posts on both Facebook and Twitter, Jurak was referred to as a member of the team. The Facebook post included a photograph of Jurak. The roster on the team's website no longer listed Peschke. Initially, no explanation was given by the Aviators for Peschke's departure from the team. The final reference to Peschke as a member of the Aviators was in a tweet on June 3, 2015, in which a photograph of her was included in a collage of pictures of the team. Although an image of Peschke appeared in a tweet by the Aviators on June 3, team rosters released by WTT to the press on the previous day, listed Jurak and not Peschke as a member of the Aviators. In a Facebook comment on July 6, 2015, the Aviators disclosed that Peschke was injured and unable to play for the team during the 2015 season. Peschke is the final player still with the team who also played for the New York Sportimes prior to the franchise's move to San Diego. Pursuant to WTT Rule 308F, Peschke may be protected by the Aviators in the 2016 WTT Draft, since she was eligible for protection in 2015, and she was injured before the 2015 season and unable to play.

On July 29, 2015, the Aviators added Daniel Nguyen to their roster as a substitute player.

Blake coaches opening match
On June 29, 2015, the Aviators announced that James Blake would coach the team in its season-opening match on July 12, at home against the California Dream. Following that match, John Lloyd  served as the Aviators coach for the remainder of the season.

In the days leading up to the season opener, the Aviators hinted in social media posts that there was a surprise in store. Just hours before the opening match, the Aviators announced that Blake would not only coach the team, but he would also play.

In what was the inaugural match for the Dream after the franchise's move from Texas and the first match for the Aviators on their new home court, San Diego prevailed with a 24–19 victory. Chanelle Scheepers opened the match by taking the women's singles and closed it by teaming with Darija Jurak for a set win in women's doubles. Blake failed to win the men's singles set (the only set the Aviators dropped), but he came back paired with Raven Klaasen for a solid win in men's doubles. Klaasen and Jurak took the mixed doubles.

Aviators miss the playoffs
The Aviators started the season strong, winning three of their first four matches. However, they followed this with a five-match losing streak that was capped off by losses on consecutive evenings in a home-and-home series with the California Dream with whom they were contending for a playoff berth. In the second loss to the Dream, the Aviators took an 18–15 lead into the final set. But former Aviators Bob and Mike Bryan teamed up to take the final set of men's doubles, 5–1, for a 20–19 Dream victory. The loss dropped the Aviators' record to 3 wins and 6 losses.

The Aviators ended their losing streak with their finest performance of the season. They swept all five sets on the road against the Springfield Lasers, the team that had beaten them in the previous season's Western Conference Championship Match. Amateur Taylor Fritz closed out the match with a 5–4 men's singles set win over John Isner after earlier teaming with Raven Klaasen for a 5–4 me's doubles set win over Isner and Andre Begemann. Klaasen and Darija Jurak got the Aviators started with a 5–4 mixed doubles set win. Chanelle Scheepers took the second set, 5–3, and teamed with Jurak in the fourth set of women's doubles for another 5–3 set win.

The following evening, the Aviators were dominated by the Austin Aces, 25–8. They were shut out in both the women's singles and women's doubles sets. A bit more than two hours later, the Aviators were eliminated from playoff contention when the Dream completed its victory over the Philadelphia Freedoms.

Event chronology
 March 3, 2015: The Aviators hired John Lloyd as their head coach replacing David Macpherson who was later hired by the California Dream.
 March 16, 2015: The Aviators traded Bob and Mike Bryan to the California Dream for financial consideration.
 March 16, 2015: The Aviators protected Raven Klaasen and Květa Peschke and selected Madison Keys, Taylor Fritz and Chanelle Scheepers at the WTT draft.
 June 2, 2015: The Aviators signed Darija Jurak, and Květa Peschke was removed from the active roster due to an injury.
 June 29, 2015: The Aviators announced that James Blake would coach the team in its season-opening match on July 12, at home against the California Dream. Following that match, John Lloyd will serve as the Aviators coach for the remainder of the season.
 July 12, 2015: The Aviators announced that James Blake would play for (in addition to coach) the team in its season-opening match.
 July 26, 2015: With a record of 4 wins and 7 losses, the Aviators were eliminated from playoff contention when the California Dream defeated the Philadelphia Freedoms, 22–16.
 July 29, 2015: The Aviators added Daniel Nguyen to their roster as a substitute player.

Draft picks
Since the Aviators had the better record of the two conference championship losers in 2014, they selected third from the bottom in each round of the draft. Unlike previous seasons in which WTT conducted its Marquee Player Draft and its Roster Player Draft on different dates about one month apart, the league conducted a single draft at the Indian Wells Tennis Garden in Indian Wells, California on March 16, 2015. The selections made by the Aviators are shown in the table below.

Match log
{| align="center" border="1" cellpadding="2" cellspacing="1" style="border:1px solid #aaa"
|-
! colspan="2" style="background:#CD231F; color:white" | Legend
|-
! bgcolor="ccffcc" | Aviators Win
! bgcolor="ffbbbb" | Aviators Loss
|-
! colspan="2" | Home team in CAPS
|}

Team personnel
Reference:

Players and coaches
 John Lloyd, Coach (other than July 12 match)
 James Blake, Player-Coach (July 12 match only)
 Jim Ault, Assistant Coach
 Taylor Fritz
 Darija Jurak
 Madison Keys
 Raven Klaasen
 Daniel Nguyen
 Květa Peschke (injured, did not play)
 Chanelle Scheepers

Front office
 Fred Luddy, Principal Owner
 Billy Berger, Minority Owner and CEO
 Jack McGrory, Minority Owner

Notes:

Statistics
Players are listed in order of their game-winning percentage provided they played in at least 40% of the Aviators' games in that event, which is the WTT minimum for qualification for league leaders in individual statistical categories.
Men's singles

Women's singles

Men's doubles

Women's doubles

Mixed doubles

Team totals

Transactions
 March 16, 2015: The Aviators traded Bob and Mike Bryan to the California Dream for financial consideration.
 March 16, 2015: The Aviators protected roster players Raven Klaasen and Květa Peschke and selected Madison Keys as a league-designated marquee player, Taylor Fritz as an amateur player and Chanelle Scheepers as a roster player at the WTT draft.
 March 16, 2015: The Aviators left Daniela Hantuchová and Somdev Devvarman unprotected in the WTT Draft effectively making them free agents.
 June 2, 2015: The Aviators signed Darija Jurak as a roster player, and Květa Peschke was removed from the active roster due to an injury.
 July 21, 2015: The Aviators signed James Blake as a wildcard player.
 July 29, 2015: The Aviators added Daniel Nguyen to their roster as a substitute player.

See also

References

External links
San Diego Aviators official website
World TeamTennis official website

San Diego Aviators season
San Diego Aviators 2015
San Diego Aviators 2015
San Diego Aviators